Ben Taylor (born 22 March 1976) is a former field hockey player from Australia, who played as a midfielder.

Personal life
Ben Taylor was born and raised in Canberra, Australian Capital Territory.

Taylor's sister, Sarah, also played representative hockey for Australia, as a member of the Hockeyroos.

Career

AHL
Ben Taylor was a member of the Canberra Lakers team for fifteen years. He debuted in the National Hockey League's inaugural season in 1993, where the team finished in sixth place.

Taylor's best performance with the Lakers was in 1998, where the team finished second.

National teams

Under–21
Ben Taylor was first named in the Australia U–21 team in 1996.

In 1997, he was a member of the gold winning team at the FIH Junior World Cup in Milton Keynes.

Kookaburras
Following a string of solid performances at National Australian Championships and in the NHL, Taylor was named in the Kookaburras team in 1998.

Throughout his career, Taylor recorded 83 caps with the senior national team, and scoring on 15 occasions.

In 2002, he won his first gold medal for Australia at the 2002 Commonwealth Games in Manchester. This came after winning both silver and bronze at the 2001 and 1998 FIH Champions Trophies, respectively.

References

External links

1976 births
Living people
Australian male field hockey players
Male field hockey midfielders
Sportsmen from the Australian Capital Territory
Commonwealth Games medallists in field hockey
Commonwealth Games gold medallists for Australia
Field hockey players at the 2002 Commonwealth Games
Medallists at the 2002 Commonwealth Games